Toader-Andrei Gontaru (born 7 February 1993) is a Romanian rower. He competed in the men's coxless four event at the 2016 Summer Olympics.

References

External links
 

1993 births
Living people
Romanian male rowers
Olympic rowers of Romania
Rowers at the 2016 Summer Olympics
Place of birth missing (living people)